Soft core or Softcore may refer to:
 Softcore microprocessor, microprocessor implemented using logic synthesis and perhaps other circuits
 Soft core (synthesis), a digital circuit that can be wholly implemented using logic synthesis
 Soft rock, a musical genre in contrast to hard rock
 Softcore pornography, erotic film or photograph that is less sexually explicit than hardcore
 Softcore Jukebox, an album by members of Ladytron
 Easycore, a genre fusing Pop punk with elements of Hardcore punk subgenres